Morelia bredli is a species of non-venomous snake in the family Pythonidae. The species is endemic to Australia. No subspecies are recognized. Its common names include Bredl's python, the Centralian python, the Centralian carpet python, the central Australian carpet python, Bredl's carpet python, the central Australian Bredl's carpet python, and the central Bredl's carpet python.

Etymology
The specific name bredli is in honor of Australian crocodile conservationist Josef "Joe" Bredl (1948–2007), brother  of "the barefoot bushman" Rob Bredl.

Description
Morelia bredli is a slender python that can reach lengths of up to, although rare, 3 meters. The color pattern consists of a brown to reddish ground color with a highly variable pattern of pale intrusions. There are normally black borders around the intrusions that become more extensive around the tail. The belly is yellowish to pale cream.

Geographic range
In Australia, M. bredli is found in the mountains of the southern Northern Territory. The type locality given is "Pitchie Ritchie Park, Alice Springs, Northern Territory, Australia (23°42', 133°51')".

Habitat
M. bredli is found in a variety of habitats: desert, savanna, forest, and freshwater wetlands, inhabiting ranges, ridges, and rocky outcrops. These animals can be find in trees, among rocky outcroppings, and on the ground.

Reproduction
M. bredli is oviparous.

Gallery

References

Further reading
Cogger HG (2014). Reptiles and Amphibians of Australia, Seventh Edition. Clayton, Victoria, Australia: CSIRO Publishing. xxx + 1,033 pp. . (Morelia bredli, p. 826).
 (Python bredli, new species).

Morelia (snake)
Reptiles described in 1981
Snakes of Australia